The Stephen Phelps House is a historic home located at Penfield in Monroe County, New York. It is a representative example of the vernacular Federal style of architecture from the settlement period.  The residence, constructed between 1814 and 1817, is the earliest intact dwelling in the town of Penfield. The frame building consists of a two-story, five bay, center entrance main block with smaller frame wings.

It was listed on the National Register of Historic Places in 1995.

References

Houses on the National Register of Historic Places in New York (state)
Federal architecture in New York (state)
Houses completed in 1817
Houses in Monroe County, New York
National Register of Historic Places in Monroe County, New York